Arturo "Benito" Castro Hernández (born June 5, 1946, in Mexico City, Mexico), is a Mexican musician, singer, songwriter, actor, imitator, most famous as a comedian, and as a member of Los Hermanos Castro (The Castro Brothers).

Benito was born into a family of musicians and entertainers. His late father, Arturo Castro aka "El Bigoton" Castro, was a famous Mexican comedian / actor who appeared in numerous movies during the Gold Age of Mexican Cinema and as a headliner in Night Clubs and Theater. His mother, Rosa Hernandez de Castro, was a homemaker. He has two sisters, Ana Maria Castro Hernandez, Born July 7, 1942, is an Entertainment Entrepreneur who manages the careers of Gualberto Castro, Los Hermanos Castro and her brother Benito Castro, and Vicky Castro Hernandez is an Interior Designer who has created the interiors for many well known individuals. Benito is 1st cousin to singer/ actor / songwriter Gualberto Castro who is one of the original members of Los Hermanos Castro along with musician / singer/ songwriter Arturo Castro Jr., also first cousin, Javier Castro, musician and singer, and the late Jorge Castro, singer. Benito is 3rd cousin to Daniela Castro, popular Mexican TV actress.

Los Hermanos Castro
As a teenager, Benito joined his cousins' musical group Los Hermanos Castro. The original group started in Mexico City during the late 1950s with three brothers, Arturo, Javier and Jorge Castro, a few years later their first cousin Gualberto Castro entered the group. The group enjoyed a great deal of success throughout the United States, Europe and South American. When the group was performing in a long term contract in Las Vegas, Benito entered the group because if it were necessary for one of the Castros to take time off, the group could continue working. Benito sang harmony and played guitar, but he also gave the group a new "zing" with his on stage antics and comedy. His personality gave the group a new dimension. According to Benito, he "fell in love with a dancer in a show in Las Vegas," they married and he became a "father at a young age."

When Los Hermanos Castro returned to Mexico, Benito continued to play gigs with Los Hermanos Castro, but also formed a musical duo with Kiko Campos. "Benito and Kiko" played in Night Clubs throughout Mexico, recorded albums and to this day still perform together in nightclubs and concerts, when Benito is not performing with Los Hermanos Castro.

Television
Benito created the personality "Kin Kin from Acapulco" for the Mexican television show La Carabina de Ambrosio from 1979 to 1983. His comedy skits portraying a sun-tanned, raggedy cut-off jean, flip-flop wearing beach bum in Acapulco was a take off of Bob Denver's role on "Gilligan's Island." His ability to imitate and mimic others like Bob Denver, politicians and singers opened the door for Benito to participate in another Mexican Television show called "La Ensalda de Locos" (Crazy People Salad). Here, he outrageously imitated people in the public eye and poked fun at their peculiarities so much so that the show was removed from television. Benito had a working relationship with the radio and television personality Paco Stanley and "how terrible it was for him to learn of the death of his friend."

Later in the 1980s, Castro wrote the theme to the television series Anabel, and continued to appear other television series. He first teamed with Maria Elena Saldana on Paco Stanley's Andale! in 1993, creating the character "El Papagringo." His comedy skits portraying him as the father of Saldana's "La Guereja" character led to two television series, La Güereja y algo más and La Güereja de mi vida, which ended in 2001.

Despite the death of Stanley and the departures of Saldana and Anabel Ferreira (Ferreira returned to Televisa in 2008), Castro continues to appear in other Televisa-produced series.

Credits in film, and television

References

1946 births
Mexican entertainers
20th-century Mexican male singers
Singers from Mexico City
Living people
Mexican male comedians
Male actors from Mexico City
Mexican impressionists (entertainers)